"Swear to Your Heart" (also titled "Caught in Your Web (Swear to Your Heart)") is a song recorded by Air Supply lead singer Russell Hitchcock in 1990. The song was written by Diane Warren. It is a track from the soundtrack album of the 1990 film Arachnophobia. The song features Timothy B. Schmit on backing vocals.

"Swear to Your Heart" was released as a CD single, and became a hit on the U.S. and Canadian Adult Contemporary charts, reaching number 9 and number 12 respectively, during early 1991.

Chart history

Weekly charts

Year-end charts

References

External links
 Lyrics of this song
 

1990 songs
1990 singles
Russell Hitchcock songs
Songs written by Diane Warren
Song recordings produced by John Boylan (record producer)
Songs written for films
1990s ballads